Thad McClammy (October 22, 1942 – August 21, 2021) was an American politician who served as a member of the Alabama House of Representatives for the 76th district from 1994 to 2021.

Early life and education 
Born in Beatrice, Alabama, McClammy received his Bachelor of Arts degree from Alabama State University in 1966 and a Master of Science in vocational and adult education from Auburn University in 1975.

Career 
McClammy was in the real estate business. He was a member of the Alabama House of Representatives for the 76th district, serving from 1994 until his death. He was a member of the Democratic party.

Personal life 
McClammy died on August 21, 2021, in Atlanta, Georgia, at age 78.

References

1942 births
2021 deaths
People from Monroe County, Alabama
Alabama State University alumni
Auburn University alumni
Businesspeople from Alabama
Democratic Party members of the Alabama House of Representatives
21st-century American politicians